Jonathan Levine (born September 29, 1963) is an American former professional tennis player.

Career
Levine played collegiate tennis at the University of Texas, and was an All-American in 1983 and 1984. In 1984 he reached the semi-finals of the NCAA Championships, and finished the year ranked #2.  He also made the round of 16 at the U.S. Pro Tennis Championships that year, with wins over Paul Annacone and Harold Solomon. In 1983 he reached the third round of the US Open, beating Victor Amaya and Peter Fleming, before losing to Ivan Lendl.

Levine won a gold medal at the 1981 Maccabiah Games in doubles with Brad Gilbert, defeating Rick Meyer of the pro tour and Paul Bernstein of Arizona State. In 1983, he won a gold medal at the Pan American Games in doubles with Eric Korita.

He lost to Michiel Schapers in the first round of the 1987 Australian Open, and was beaten by Jason Stoltenberg in the opening round of the 1988 Australian Open.

Levine made the semi-finals of the doubles event at Cleveland in 1985, the 1987 Heineken Open, the 1987 Seoul Open and Los Angeles in 1988.

In 1988, Levine was a men's doubles quarter-finalist at both the French Open and US Open. His partner in each tournament was Eric Korita.

Challenger titles

Doubles: (3)

See also

List of select Jewish tennis players

References

1963 births
Living people
American male tennis players
Texas Longhorns men's tennis players
Tennis people from Arizona
Pan American Games medalists in tennis
Pan American Games gold medalists for the United States
Tennis players at the 1983 Pan American Games
Medalists at the 1983 Pan American Games